Infanta Maria Cristina of Spain, Countess Marone-Cinzano (María Cristina Teresa Alejandra María de Guadalupe María de la Concepción Ildefonsa Victoria Eugenia de Borbón y Battenberg; 12 December 1911 – 23 December 1996) was the fifth child and younger daughter of Alfonso XIII of Spain and Victoria Eugenie of Battenberg and paternal aunt of King Juan Carlos I.

Biography

Early life
Infanta Maria Cristina was born at the Palacio Real in Madrid, Spain. The Spanish Royal Family left the country in 1931, in the face of Republican demonstrations, settling in Paris, before moving to Fontainebleau.

By 1933 King Alfonso and his daughters, the Infantas Beatriz and Maria Cristina, had moved to Rome. Their father warned would-be suitors of the inherent dangers of hemophilia, from which two of the king's sons, Alfonso and Gonzalo, suffered.

Marriage and issue

She renounced her succession rights to the throne of the defunct Spanish crown and, on 10 June 1940, morganatically married Conte Enrico Eugenio Marone-Cinzano (15 March 1895 Turin – 23 October 1968 Geneva) in Rome. He had been created 1st Count Marone-Cinzano on 13 May 1940 by Victor Emmanuel III of Italy. He was the son of Alberto Marone and his wife, Paola Cinzano. Maria Cristina had one step-son, from Enrico's previous marriage to Noemí Rosa de Alcorta y García-Mansilla (1907-1929):

Don Alberto, 2nd Count Marone-Cinzano (1929-1989); married Donna Cristina, dei Conti Camerana (b. 1935), great-granddaughter of Giovanni Agnelli. Had issue.

The marriage of Maria Cristina and Enrico Eugenio produced four daughters:

Doña Vittoria Eugenia Alfonsa Alberta del Pilar Enrica Paola Marone-Cinzano (b. Turin, 5 March 1941) she married José Carlos Álvarez de Toledo y Gross, 6th Marquess of Casa Loring (1929–2000) on 12 January 1961. They have four children and five grandchildren
Doña Giovanna Paola Gabriella Marone-Cinzano (b. 31 January 1943) she married Jaime Galobart y Satrústegui (4 February 1935) on 24 July 1967 and they were divorced in 1980. They have one son and three grandsons. She remarried Luis Ángel Sánchez-Merlo y Ruiz (b. Valladolid, 10 October 1947) on 4 August 1989.
Doña María Theresa Beatrice Marone-Cinzano (b. Lausanne, 4 January 1945), married in Geneva on 22 April 1967 and divorced in 1989 José María Ruiz de Arana y Montalvo (Madrid, 27 April 1933 – Madrid, 30 April 2004), 17th Duke of Baena, 17th Duke of Sanlúcar la Mayor, 15th Marquess of Villamanrique, 13th Marquess of Castromonte, 5th Marquess of Brenes, 11th Count of Sevilla La Nueva and 5th Viscount of Mamblas. They have three daughters and three grandchildren.
Doña Anna Alessandra (Anna Sandra) Marone-Cinzano (b. Turin, 21 December 1948) she married Gian Carlo Stavro Santarosa on 7 December 1968 and they were divorced in 1975. They have two daughters. She remarried Fernando Schwartz y Giron in 1985.

Death
Infanta Maria Cristina returned to Spain and spent periods of time there, but never lived there permanently. She died in Madrid of a heart attack on 23 December 1996 during a Christmas reunion of the royal family at the Villa Giralda, the residence of her cousin and sister-in-law, the Countess of Barcelona.  A funeral service for the Infanta was held in the chapel of the Royal Palace of Madrid on December 24, and a burial service was held on December 26 in the Marone-Cinzano Pantheon in Turin.

Honours
 : 1,112th Dame Grand Cross of the Order of Queen Maria Luisa

Arms

Ancestry

References

External links
El Pais, La Familia Real asiste al entierro de la infanta María Cristina en Turín, 27 December 1996
 El Pais; Funeral en la capilla del Palacio Real por la infanta María Cristina, 26 December 1996
 El Pais, Muere a los 85 años en Madrid la infanta María Cristina de Borbón,La tía del Rey sufrió un infarto en Casa de la condesa de Barcelona, 24 December 1996 
 Enrique González Fernández: Homenaje a la Infanta María Cristina

Spanish infantas
House of Bourbon (Spain)
1911 births
1996 deaths
Daughters of kings